Bobby Livingstone is a Scottish former football player and manager, who is mainly associated with Montrose. He made 351 appearances and scored 130 goals in the Scottish Football League for Montrose, and managed the club between 1979 and 1982. He resigned in April 1982 and was replaced by Stevie Murray.

References

Scottish footballers
Association football forwards
Montrose F.C. players
Scottish Football League players
Scottish football managers
Montrose F.C. managers
Living people
Scottish Football League managers
Year of birth missing (living people)